Silvorchis is a genus of flowering plants from the orchid family, Orchidaceae. Only one species is known, Silvorchis colorata, endemic to Java. This is a holomycotrophic species, completely lacking in chlorophyll. 

Silvorchis was previously included in the subtribe Epipogiinae, but is now placed in Orchidinae.

See also 
 List of Orchidaceae genera

References

External links 
IOSPE orchid photos, Silvorchis colorata, 1907 drawing by J.J. Smith

Orchids of Java
Monotypic Orchidoideae genera
Orchideae
Myco-heterotrophic orchids
Orchideae genera